Resource dependence theory (RDT) is the study of how the external resources of organizations affect the behavior of the organization. The procurement of external resources is an important tenet of both the strategic and tactical management of any company. Nevertheless, a theory of the consequences of this importance was not formalized until the 1970s, with the publication of The External Control of Organizations:  A Resource Dependence Perspective (Pfeffer and Salancik 1978). Resource dependence theory has implications regarding the optimal divisional structure of organizations, recruitment of board members and employees, production strategies, contract structure, external organizational links, and many other aspects of organizational strategy.

Argument for
The basic argument of resource dependence theory can be summarized as follows:
 Organizations depend on resources. 
 These resources ultimately originate from an organization's environment.
 The environment, to a considerable extent, contains other organizations.
 The resources one organization needs are thus often in the hand of other organizations.
 Resources are a basis of power.
 Legally independent organizations can therefore depend on each other.
 Power and resource dependence are directly linked:
 Organization A's power over organization B is equal to organization B's dependence on organization A's resources. 
 Power is thus relational, situational and potentially mutual.

Organizations depend on multidimensional resources: labor, capital, raw material, etc. Organizations may not be able to come out with countervailing initiatives for all these multiple resources. Hence organization should move through the principle of criticality and principle of scarcity. Critical resources are those the organization must have to function. For example, a burger outlet can't function without bread. An organization may adopt various countervailing strategies—it may associate with more suppliers, or integrate vertically or horizontally.

Basic concerns

Resource dependence concerns more than the external organizations that provide, distribute, finance, and compete with a firm.  Although executive decisions have more individual weight than non-executive decisions, in aggregate the latter have greater organizational impact.  Managers throughout the organization understand their success is tied to customer demand.  Managers'
careers thrive when customer demand expands.  Thus customers are the ultimate resource on which companies depend.  Although this seems obvious in terms of revenue, it is actually organizational incentives that make management see customers as a resource.

Resource dependence theory effects on nonprofit sector have been studied and debated in recent times. Scholars have argued that Resource dependence theory is one of the main reasons nonprofit organizations have become more commercialized in recent times. With less government grants and resources being used for social services, contract competition between private and nonprofit sector has increased and led to nonprofit organizations using marketization techniques used mainly in the private sector to compete for resources to maintain their organizations livelihood. Scholars have argued that the marketization of the nonprofit sector will lead to a decrease of quality in services provided by nonprofit organizations.

Criticisms
Recently, resource dependence theory has been under scrutiny in several review and meta-analytic studies: Hillman et al. (2009); Davis and Cobb (2010); Drees & Heugens (2013); Sharif & Yeoh (2014). Which all indicate and discuss the importance of this theory in explaining the actions of organizations, by forming interlocks, alliances, joint ventures, and mergers and acquisitions, in striving to overcome dependencies and improve an organizational autonomy and legitimacy.  While resource dependence theory is one of many theories of organizational studies that characterize organizational behavior, it is not a theory that explains an organization's performance per se. But still in many ways, resource dependence theory predictions are similar to those of transaction cost economics, but it also shares some aspects with institutional theory[Nienhuser, 2008].

References

Boyd, B. (1990). "Corporate Linkages and Organizational Environment: A Test of the Resource Dependence Model." Strategic Management Journal 11(6): 419–430.
Davis, G. F. and J. A. Cobb (2010) "Resource dependence theory: Past and future." Stanford's organization theory ftutudtjudtdtudation of the Nonprofit Sector: Civil Society at Risk?" Public Administration Review, (64)2: 132-140.
Hayward, M. L. A. and W. Boeker (1998). "Power and Conflicts of Interest in Professional Firms: Evidence from Investment Banking." Administrative Science Quarterly 43(1): 1-22.
Hillman, A. J., Withers, M. C. and B. J. Collins (2009). "Resource dependence theory: A review." Journal of Management 35: 1404–1427.
 Pfeffer, J. (1982). Organizations and Organization Theory. Marshfield, MA, Pitman.
 Pfeffer, J. and G. R. Salancik (1978). The External Control of Organizations:  A Resource Dependence Perspective. New York, NY, Harper and Row.
Salancik, G. R. (1979). "Interorganizational Dependence and Responsiveness to Affirmative Action: The Case of Women and Defense Contractors." Academy of Management Journal 22(2): 375–394.
Scott, W. R. (2003). Organizations: Rational, Natural and Open Systems (5th edition), Prentice Hall.
 Sharif, S. P. and Yeoh, K. K. (2014). "Independent Directors’ Resource Provision Capability in listed Companies in Malaysia." Corporate Ownership and Control 11(3): 113–121.

See also
Consumer sovereignty
Economic anthropology

Organizational theory